is a test sodium-cooled fast reactor located in Ōarai, Ibaraki, Japan, operated by the Japan Atomic Energy Agency.  The name comes from the previous country name of the area around Ibaraki.

It was made with the purpose of doing tests on and advancing the development of that type of reactor, as an irradiation test facility for construction materials. It also does tests with the nuclear fuel as well as activation experiments.

The reactor has gone through 3 different core changes.
MK-I April 24, 1977 - January 1, 1982 (the power was 50-75 MWt)
MK-II November 22, 1982 - September 12, 1997. This core surpassed 50,000 hours of operating time with 100 MWt.
MK-III July 2, 2003–2007 (140-150 MWt).

The current core provides the neutron flux of 4×1015 cm−2s−1 for E>0.1 MeV.

After an incident in 2007, the reactor is suspended for repairing, recovery works were planned to be completed in 2014.

Following the closure of the unsuccessful follow-on fast breeder reactor Monju in 2016, a decision was made to continue research at Jōyō.

See also
Monju
Nuclear power in Japan

References

External links
Official Joyo site (in english)
Joyo user guide
T. Soga, W. Itagaki, Y. Kihara, Y. Maeda. Endeavor to improve in-pile testing techniques in the experimental fast reactor Joyo. / In-pile testing and instrumentation for development of generation-IV fuels and materials. Proceedings of a technical meeting held in Halden, Norway, 21–24 August 2012. - IAEA, 2013. - P. 107–122.
T. Shikama et al. Heavy neutron irradiation test of materials in Joyo instrumented rigs. / In-pile testing and instrumentation for development of generation-IV fuels and materials. Proceedings of a technical meeting held in Halden, Norway, 21–24 August 2012. - IAEA, 2013. - P. 165–170.

Nuclear research reactors
Liquid metal fast reactors
Buildings and structures in Ibaraki Prefecture
Ōarai, Ibaraki